High-functioning autism (HFA) is an autism classification where a person exhibits no intellectual disability, but may exhibit deficits in communication, emotion recognition and expression, and social interaction. HFA is not included in either the American Psychological Association's DSM-5 or the World Health Organization's ICD-10, neither of which subdivides autism based on intellectual capabilities.

Characterization
High-functioning autism is characterized by features similar to those of Asperger syndrome. The defining characteristic recognized by psychologists is a significant delay in the development of early speech and language skills, before the age of three years. The diagnostic criteria of Asperger syndrome exclude a general language delay.

Further differences in features of people with high-functioning autism from those with Asperger syndrome include the following: 
 Lower verbal reasoning ability
 Better visual/spatial skills (Being uniquely artistically talented)
 Less deviating locomotion (e.g. clumsiness)
 Problems functioning independently
 Curiosity and interest for many different things
 Not as good at empathizing with other people
 Male to female ratio (4:1) much smaller
As of 2013, Asperger Syndrome and High-functioning autism are no longer terms used by the American Psychological Association, and have instead both been merged into autism spectrum disorder (ASD). As of 2021, the World Health Organization also retired the terms and merged them into autism spectrum disorder.

Comorbidities
Individuals with autism spectrum disorders, including high-functioning autism, risk developing symptoms of anxiety. While anxiety is one of the most commonly occurring mental health symptoms, children and adolescents with high functioning autism are at an even greater risk of developing symptoms.

There are other comorbidities, the presence of one or more disorders in addition to the primary disorder, associated with high-functioning autism. Some of these include bipolar disorder and obsessive–compulsive disorder (OCD). In particular the link between HFA and OCD, has been studied; both have abnormalities associated with serotonin.

Observable comorbidities associated with HFA include ADHD and Tourette syndrome. HFA does not cause, nor include, intellectual disabilities. This characteristic distinguishes HFA from low-functioning autism; between 40 and 55% of individuals with autism also have an intellectual disability.

Behavior
An association between HFA and criminal behavior is not completely characterized. Several studies have shown that the features associated with HFA may increase the probability of engaging in criminal behavior. While there is still a great deal of research that needs to be done in this area, recent studies on the correlation between HFA and criminal actions suggest that there is a need to understand the attributes of HFA that may lead to violent behavior. There have been several case studies that link the lack of empathy and social naïveté associated with HFA to criminal actions.

There is still a need for more research on the link between HFA and crimes, because many other studies point out that most people with ASD are more likely to be victims and less likely to commit crimes than the general population. But there are also small-subgroups of people with autism that commit crimes because they lack understanding of the laws they have broken. Misunderstandings are especially common regarding autism and sex offenses, since many people with autism do not receive sex education.

Cause

Although little is known about the biological basis of autism, studies have revealed structural abnormalities in specific brain regions. Regions identified in the "social" brain include the amygdala, superior temporal sulcus, fusiform gyrus area and orbitofrontal cortex. Further abnormalities have been observed in the caudate nucleus, believed to be involved in restrictive behaviors, as well as in a significant increase in the amount of cortical grey matter and atypical connectivity between brain regions.

Diagnosis and IQ

HFA is not a recognised diagnosis by the American Psychological Association (DSM-5) or the World Health Organization (ICD-10). HFA is often, however, used in clinical settings to describe a set of symptoms related to an autism spectrum disorder whereby they exhibit standard autism indicators although have an intelligence quotient (IQ) of 70 or greater.

For modern IQ tests, the raw score is transformed to a normal distribution with mean 100 and standard deviation 15. This results in approximately two-thirds of the population scoring between IQ 85 and IQ 115 and about 2.5 percent each above 130 and below 70.

IQ scales are ordinally scaled. The raw score of the norming sample is usually (rank order) transformed to a normal distribution with mean 100 and standard deviation 15. While one standard deviation is 15 points, and two SDs are 30 points, and so on, this does not imply that mental ability is linearly related to IQ, such that IQ 50 would mean half the cognitive ability of IQ 100. In particular, IQ points are not percentage points.

A diagnosis of intellectual disability is in part based on the results of IQ testing. Borderline intellectual functioning is the categorization of individuals of below-average cognitive ability (an IQ of 71–85), although not as low as those with an intellectual disability (70 or below).

People with high IQs are found at all levels of education and occupational categories. The biggest difference occurs for low IQs with only an occasional college graduate or professional scoring below 90.

Treatment

While there exists no single treatment or medicine for people with autism, there exists several strategies to help lessen the symptoms and effects of the condition.

Augmentative and alternative communication 
Augmentative and alternative communication (AAC) is used for autistic people who cannot communicate orally. People who have problems speaking may be taught to use other forms of communication, such as body language, computers, interactive devices, and pictures. The Picture Exchange Communication System (PECS) is a commonly used form of augmentative and alternative communication with children and adults who cannot communicate well orally. People are taught how to link pictures and symbols to their feelings, desires and observation, and may be able to link sentences together with the vocabulary that they form.

Speech-language therapy

Speech–language therapy can help those with autism who need to develop or improve communication skills. According to the organization Autism Speaks, "speech-language therapy is designed to coordinate the mechanics of speech with the meaning and social use of speech". People with autism may have issues with communication, or speaking spoken words. Speech-language pathologists (SLP) may teach someone how to communicate more effectively with others or work on starting to develop speech patterns. The SLP will create a plan that focuses on what the child needs.

Occupational therapy
Occupational therapy helps autistic children and adults learn everyday skills that help them with daily tasks, such as personal hygiene and movement. These skills are then integrated into their home, school, and work environments. Therapists will oftentimes help people learn to adapt their environment to their skill level. This type of therapy could help autistic people become more engaged in their environment. An occupational therapist will create a plan based on a person's needs and desires and work with them to achieve their set goals.

Applied behavioral analysis (ABA)
Applied behavior analysis (ABA) is considered the most effective therapy for autism spectrum disorders by the American Academy of Pediatrics. ABA focuses on teaching adaptive behaviors like social skills, play skills, or communication skills and diminishing problematic behaviors such as self-injury by creating a specialized plan that uses behavioral therapy techniques, such as positive or negative reinforcement, to encourage or discourage certain behaviors over-time. However, ABA has been strongly criticised by the autistic community, who view it as abusive and detrimental to autistic children's growth.

Sensory integration therapy

Sensory integration therapy helps people with autism adapt to different kinds of sensory stimuli. Many with autism can be oversensitive to certain stimuli, such as lights or sounds, causing them to overreact. Others may not react to certain stimuli, such as someone speaking to them. Many types of therapy activities involve a form of play, such as using swings, toys and trampolines to help engage people with sensory stimuli. Therapists will create a plan that focuses on the type of stimulation the person needs integration with.

Neurofeedback

Studies suggest Neurofeedback alleviates certain symptoms of autism, such as emotional outbursts, hyperactivity, resistance to change, and stimming. Although considered a safe, non-invasive procedure, it may potentially involve some side effects.

Medication 

There are no medications specifically designed to treat autism. Medication is usually used for symptoms associated with autism, such as depression, anxiety, or behavioral problems. Medicines are usually used after other alternative forms of treatment have failed.

Criticism of functioning labels 
Many medical professionals, autistic people, and supporters of autistic rights disagree with the categorisation of individuals into "high-functioning autism" and "low-functioning autism", stating that the "low-functioning" label causes people to put low expectations on a child and view them as lesser. Furthermore, critics of functioning labels state that an individual's functioning can fluctuate from day to day, and categories do not take this into consideration. Levels of functioning are unrelated to intellectual disability. Additionally, individuals with "medium-functioning autism" are typically left out of the discussion entirely, and due to the non-linear nature of the autistic spectrum, individuals can be high-functioning in some areas while at the same time being medium or low functioning in other areas.

See also
 Asperger syndrome and neuroscience
 Autism-spectrum quotient, a self-administered test for high-functioning autism
 Historical figures sometimes considered autistic
 Low-functioning autism
 Nonverbal learning disorder
 Lorna Wing

References

Further reading 
 

Autism spectrum disorders
Learning disabilities